Matteo Gasperi (born 17 July 1997) is an Italian footballer who plays as a midfielder for  club Monterosi.

Club career
He made his Serie B debut for Cesena on 23 January 2016 in a game against Virtus Entella.

On 16 July 2019, he joined Virtus Verona.

On 31 January 2020, he signed a 1.5-year contract with Südtirol with an option to extend for another season.

On 23 September 2020, he moved to Legnago.

On 11 July 2021, he joined Ancona-Matelica.

On 8 July 2022, Gasperi signed with Monterosi.

References

External links
 

1997 births
Living people
People from Forlì
Footballers from Emilia-Romagna
Italian footballers
Association football midfielders
Serie B players
Serie C players
Serie D players
A.C. Cesena players
Fermana F.C. players
Alma Juventus Fano 1906 players
A.S.D. Victor San Marino players
Virtus Verona players
F.C. Südtirol players
F.C. Legnago Salus players
Ancona-Matelica players
Monterosi Tuscia F.C. players
Italian expatriate footballers
Italian expatriate sportspeople in San Marino
Expatriate footballers in San Marino
Sportspeople from the Province of Forlì-Cesena